In Hamburg When the Nights Are Long (German: In Hamburg sind die Nächte lang) is a 1956 West German crime film directed by Max Michel and starring Barbara Rütting, Erwin Strahl and Dorit Kreysler. It was shot at the Göttingen Studios. The film's sets were designed by the art director Curt Stallmach.

Cast
 Barbara Rütting  as Karin Thorwaldt
 Erwin Strahl  as Hans Karst
 Dorit Kreysler  as Lili Radona
 Werner Fuetterer  as Andersson
 Alexander Golling  as Alexander Borgess
 Ernst von Klipstein  as Kapitän Reinhardt
 John Van Dreelen  as Peter Drante
 Gustl Gstettenbaur Conny
 Christiane Maybach as Helen Dayton
 Joseph Offenbach as Klitzchen
 Peter Bermbach  as Dr. Calton
 Willy Rösner as Vater Grigori
 Waldemar Adelberger as Kriminalrat Lieberenz
 Robert Meyn as Konsul Thorwaldt

References

Bibliography 
 Gustav Meier. Filmstadt Göttingen: Bilder für eine neue Welt? : zur Geschichte der Göttinger Spielfilmproduktion 1945 bis 1961. Reichold, 1996.

External links 
 

1956 films
1956 crime films
German crime films
West German films
1950s German-language films
Films directed by Max Michel
Films set in Hamburg
1950s German films
Films shot at Göttingen Studios
German black-and-white films